Galasa nigrinodis, the boxwood leaftier moth or boxwood webworm,  is moth of the family Pyralidae. It is found in eastern North America.

The wingspan is 13–20 mm. Adults are on wing from June to September.

The larvae feed on the leaves of Buxus species. They tie together and eat dead leaves of their host plant.

References

Moths described in 1873
Chrysauginae